Descon is a Pakistani multinational company which is based in Lahore, Pakistan. The company was founded on 15 December 1977. It operates in the engineering, power and chemicals sectors.

Descon is the only Pakistani engineering company to be included in the Engineering News-Record (a US magazine) list since 2007.

History
The company was founded by Abdul Razak Dawood as Design Engineering and Construction Services (Descon) in 1977. The initial money used for the startup was  3.2 million. From this, they expanded into three sectors and are now operating in UAE, Qatar, Saudi Arabia, Kuwait, Oman. Iraq and South Africa.

The company got its first contract when Attock Refinery asked to set up a small refinery in 1978. In 1981, they got a bigger four-year project of National Refinery which helped the company to expand.

In 1982, they tried to expand to regional markets, where they helped a Saudi company and afterward got a small project in Abu Dhabi. By 2018, this company was generating 60% of its income from overseas markets which helped the company grow to be a billion-dollar company.

In 2018, Descon expanded its footprint into South Africa by acquiring 26% of Plant Design and Project Services (PDPS) an engineering firm there.

Businesses
The Engineering Business comprises following establishments:
 Descon Engineering Limited
 Descon Engineering Abu Dhabi
 Descon Engineering Qatar LLC
 Descon Engineering Hamriyah FZE
 Descon Engineering Services & Technology (Pvt.) Limited
 Presson Descon International Limited
 Olayan Descon Engineering Company, Kingdom of Saudi Arabia
 Descon Technical Institute, Pakistan

Descon Chemicals Business comprises the following establishment:
 Descon Oxychem Limited (manufacturing plant of Hydrogen Peroxide – a bleaching and oxidizing agent used in textile, paper and food industries

 In financial year 2016-17, Descon's chemical business recorded a growth of 356% in profit.

Power
Descon Power owns the following establishments:
 Descon Power Solutions (Pvt.) Limited
 Rousch Power Pakistan Limited
 Altern Energy Limited

Operation & maintenance
It is also active in operation & maintenance (O&M) of power plants in Pakistan. Following is a list power plants which have contracted with the Descon for operation & maintenance:
 FFC Energy Limited (FFCEL)
 FWEL-I
 FWEL-II
 Metro Wind Power
 Gul Ahmed Wind Power
 Yunus Wind Power
 Hartford Alternate Energy

See also
 List of companies of Pakistan
 Pearl GTL

References

External links
Descon

Companies based in Lahore
Pakistani companies established in 1977
Construction and civil engineering companies of Pakistan
Pakistani brands
Multinational companies headquartered in Pakistan
Construction and civil engineering companies established in 1977
Chemical companies of Pakistan
Electric power companies of Pakistan
Chemical companies established in 1977